A bust of Phil Lynott by Luke Perry was installed in West Bromwich, West Midlands, in 2021.

References

External links
 

2021 establishments in England
2021 sculptures
Black people in art
Busts in the United Kingdom
Monuments and memorials in England
Outdoor sculptures in England
Sculptures of men in the United Kingdom
West Bromwich